Elections to Newry and Mourne District Council were held on 20 May 1981 on the same day as the other Northern Irish local government elections. The election used six district electoral areas to elect a total of 30 councillors.

Election results

Note: "Votes" are the first preference votes.

Districts summary

|- class="unsortable" align="centre"
!rowspan=2 align="left"|Ward
! % 
!Cllrs
! % 
!Cllrs
! %
!Cllrs
! %
!Cllrs
! %
!Cllrs
! %
!Cllrs
!rowspan=2|TotalCllrs
|- class="unsortable" align="center"
!colspan=2 bgcolor="" | SDLP
!colspan=2 bgcolor="" | UUP
!colspan=2 bgcolor="" | IIP
!colspan=2 bgcolor="" | DUP
!colspan=2 bgcolor="" | Anti H-Block
!colspan=2 bgcolor="white"| Others
|-
|align="left"|Area A
|31.9
|2
|bgcolor="40BFF5"|35.4
|bgcolor="40BFF5"|2
|0.0
|0
|23.1
|1
|0.0
|0
|9.6
|0
|5
|-
|align="left"|Area B
|bgcolor="#99FF66"|64.0
|bgcolor="#99FF66"|4
|8.9
|0
|8.5
|0
|2.8
|0
|0.0
|0
|15.8
|0
|4
|-
|align="left"|Area C
|bgcolor="#99FF66"|40.0
|bgcolor="#99FF66"|2
|26.0
|1
|0.0
|0
|22.2
|1
|0.0
|0
|11.8
|0
|4
|-
|align="left"|Area D
|bgcolor="#99FF66"|37.1
|bgcolor="#99FF66"|3
|19.1
|2
|25.8
|2
|3.9
|0
|0.0
|0
|14.1
|0
|7
|-
|align="left"|Area E
|bgcolor="#99FF66"|40.0
|bgcolor="#99FF66"|3
|7.6
|0
|7.6
|1
|3.7
|0
|30.1
|2
|11.0
|0
|6
|-
|align="left"|Area F
|bgcolor="#99FF66"|43.4
|bgcolor="#99FF66"|2
|16.2
|1
|21.6
|1
|5.6
|0
|0.0
|2
|13.2
|0
|6
|- class="unsortable" class="sortbottom" style="background:#C9C9C9"
|align="left"| Total
|41.7
|16
|18.7
|6
|11.4
|4
|9.5
|2
|6.1
|2
|12.6
|0
|30
|-
|}

Districts results

Area A

1977: 2 x UUP, 2 x SDLP, 1 x DUP
1981: 2 x UUP, 2 x SDLP, 1 x DUP
1977-1981 Change: No change

Area B

1977: 2 x SDLP, 1 x Alliance, 1 x Independent Nationalist
1981: 4 x SDLP
1977-1981 Change: SDLP (two seats) gain from Alliance and Independent Nationalist

Area C

1977: 2 x SDLP, 2 x UUP
1981: 2 x SDLP, 1 x UUP, 1 x DUP
1977-1981 Change: DUP gain from UUP

Area D

1977: 3 x SDLP, 2 x UUP, 1 x Alliance, 1 x Independent Nationalist
1981: 3 x SDLP, 2 x UUP, 1 x IIP
1977-1981 Change: IIP gain from Alliance, Independent Nationalist joins IIP

Area E

1977: 4 x SDLP, 1 x Independent Nationalist, 1 x Independent Republican
1981: 3 x SDLP, 2 x Anti H-Block, 1 x IIP
1977-1981 Change: Anti H-Block (two seats) gain from SDLP and Independent Republican, Independent Nationalist joins IIP

Area F

1977: 2 x SDLP, 1 x UUP, 1 x Alliance
1981: 2 x SDLP, 1 x UUP, 1 x IIP
1977-1981 Change: IIP gain from Alliance

References

Newry and Mourne District Council elections
Newry and Mourne